Planograms, also known as plano-grams, plan-o-grams, schematics and POGs, are visual representations of a store's products or services on display. They are considered a tool for visual merchandising. According to the Merriam-Webster Dictionary, a planogram is "a schematic drawing or plan for displaying merchandise in a store so as to maximize sales." The effectiveness of the planogram can be measured by the sales volume generated from the specific area being diagrammed.

Overview
Planograms are predominantly used in retail businesses. A planogram defines the location and quantity of products to be placed on display. The rules and theories for creating planograms are set under the terms of merchandising. For example, given limited shelf space, a vendor may prefer to provide a wide assortment of products, or may limit the assortment but increase the facings of each product to avoid stock-outs. Manufacturers often send planograms to stores ahead of new product shipments. This is useful when a vendor wants retail displays in multiple store locations to have the same look and feel. Often, a consumer goods manufacturer releases a planogram with each new product to show how the product can relate to existing products.

Fast-moving consumer goods organizations and supermarkets mostly use text and box-based planograms to optimize shelf space, inventory turns and profit margins. Apparel brands and retailers are more focused on presentation and use pictorial planograms that illustrate the look and brand identity for each product.

Placement methods

Visual
Visual product placement is supported by different theories including; horizontal, vertical, and block placement. Horizontal product placement increases the concentration of a certain article. Research studies suggest that a product's relation to customer eye levels directly correlates to its sales. This depends on the customer's distance from the unit. Vertical product placement puts products on more than one shelf level to achieve  –  of placement space. Similar products are placed in blocks.
A planogram can be compared to a book. A store is the book and its individual modules represent the pages. The customer gradually “reads” individual modules and automatically proceeds from the left to the right, from the top to the bottom as if he/she read a book. This principle is followed by a majority of rules for goods displaying. The rules say that goods should be arranged on a shelf from the least to the most expensive ones. Goods may also be arranged in the reverse order, depending on the kind of goods that the dealer wishes to promote. This makes the difference between dealers of cheap and luxury goods.

Commercial
Commercial placement is determined by both market share placement and margin placement. Market share research companies like ACNielsen collect sales data for various products and calculate market share of products in various market segments. Margin placement is determined by the profit margin of a specific item. Higher margin places a product closer to the front of the store, where it is most likely to attract attention.

Derivative objectives

 To communicate how to set the merchandise
 To ensure sufficient inventory levels on the shelf or display
 To use space effectively (e.g. floor, page, and screen)
 To facilitate communication of retailer's brand identity
 To assist in the process of mapping a store
 To improve customer satisfaction by shelves that are organized and visually-appealing

Creation
The planogram concept originated with KMart. Planograms are created with the help of planogramming software by a Planogram Specialist, Space Planning Specialist or Space Planning Manager. The retail industry utilizes software to ensure proper stocking. Retailers turn to planogram software to reflect each store’s particular customer profile and localized demand, while maintaining centralized control and supply chain efficiency. 

For example, some software packages focused upon fast-moving consumer goods and hard goods sectors made enhancements to transfer parts of shelving elements to single store measurements, which, according to the producers, should increase efficiency.

Retailers automate the creation of store-specific planograms through use of corporate-level business rules and constraints describing best practices. Such planogramming solutions allow these companies to respond with location and language-specific messaging, pricing, and product placements based on business rules derived from location, campaign and fixture attributes to create localized assortments.

Recent advances in store virtualization and collaboration allow manufacturers, retailers and category management experts from across the globe to work in the same virtual store in real time.

References

Retail processes and techniques
Diagrams
Retail store elements